City Beach can refer to:
Urban beach, a modern leisure concept
City Beach, Western Australia, a suburb of Perth, Western Australia
City Beach (album), a solo album by Jill Cunniff, the frontwoman of Luscious Jackson
City Beach (retailer), a large retailer of skating and surfing equipment in Australia